The Sony Ericsson Xperia arc S (Xperia LT18i) is a high-end smartphone developed by Sony Ericsson running Google's operating system Android 2.3.4 (Gingerbread). It is an upgraded version of the Sony Xperia Arc. It is the last phone carrying the Sony Ericsson brand, before Sony bought Ericsson's stake in the joint-venture.

Unveiled on August 31, 2011 at Sony’s press conference in conjunction with IFA in Berlin, Germany and scheduled for release in October, it was released in October 2011. The device's primary improvements over its predecessor are a 1.4 GHz Scorpion Snapdragon CPU and 14.4Mbit/s HSDPA, compared to the same model at 1.0 GHz and 7.2Mbit/s HSDPA in the Arc. Aside from the CPU speed upgrade and HSDPA speed upgrade, additional hardware remains unchanged.

The Xperia arc S, along the Xperia Mini Pro, would not be receiving an Android 4.1 Jelly Bean update, as Sony Mobile Communications officially confirmed via their Facebook page on July 26, 2012. However, this statement was then retracted and Sony has issued a new statement stating they are investigating the possibility of software upgrades for the two devices. However, as of December 2015, the upgrade has not materialised.

Hardware 
The Arc S features a capacitive touchscreen display of 4.2 inches and is equipped with an 8.1-megapixel camera with Exmor R for low-light capture. The camera supports 720p high definition video.

The device ships with an 8 GB microSD card for user storage and is expandable up to 32 GB (SDHC) or 64 GB (SDXC).

It comes in several colours: "Pure White", "Midnight Blue", "Misty Silver", "Gloss Black", "Sakura Pink".

Camera and video 
8.1-megapixel camera with LED flash and auto focus
Sony's Exmor™ R for mobile CMOS sensor
16x smart zoom
f/2.4 Aperture
HD video recording (720p), up to 30 frames per second
3D Sweep Panorama
Image playback, supported formats: BMP, GIF, JPEG, PNG, WBMP
Image capture, supported format: JPEG
Video playback and recording, supported formats: 3GPP, MP4
Accelerated Adobe Flash Video

Connectivity and communication 
USB High speed 2.0 and Micro USB support
Wi-Fi and Wi-Fi hotspot functionality
HDMI support
DLNA certified
Synchronisation via Exchange ActiveSync, Google Sync and Facebook
aGPS
WebKit web browser with pan and zoom
Bluetooth technology

Memory 
Internal phone storage: up to 2 GB 
RAM: 512 MB
Expansion slot: microSD, up to 64 Gb

Networks 
GSM GPRS/EDGE 850 MHz, 900 MHz, 1800 MHz, 1900 MHz
UMTS HSPA 900 MHz, 2100 MHz (Global except Americas)
UMTS HSPA 800 MHz, 850 MHz, 1900 MHz, 2100 MHz (Americas)

Entertainment 
TrackID music recognition
xLOUD Experience – audio filter technology from Sony
FM Radio with RDS
3.5 mm audio jack for headphones
Audio playback, supported formats: MP3, 3GPP, MP4, SMF, WAV, OTA, Ogg Vorbis
Audio recording, supported formats: 3GPP, MP4, AMR
3D and motion gaming
Timescape with Twitter integrated
Facebook inside Xperia 2.0
Sony Entertainment Network (selected markets only)

Display 
4.2", 854x480 pixels 16,777,216 colour TFT
Reality Display with mobile BRAVIA® engine
Scratch-resistant, shatterproof sheet on mineral glass
Capacitive touchscreen with on-screen QWERTY keyboard
Screenshot capturing

Software 
It was released running Android 2.3.4, was updated to Android 4.0.3 Ice Cream Sandwich in January 2012 and updated to Android 4.0.4 in May 2012.

Pre-loaded applications:
 Google Voice Search
 Google Talk
 Google Mail
 Google Calendar
 Google Gallery 3D
 Google Maps with Street View

References

External links
Official website (archived)
Sony Ericsson Xperia arc S at GSMArena.com
Sony Ericsson Xperia ARC S Honest Review 

Android (operating system) devices
Mobile phones introduced in 2011
Sony Ericsson smartphones